"All God's Chillun Got Wings" is a Negro spiritual song. "Chillun" is an old-fashioned dialect word for "children". (Robeson sings it as "children" in his recording, although the printed lyrics say "chillun".)

Its title inspired the Eugene O'Neill play All God's Chillun Got Wings.

References

External links
Paul Robeson recording of the song
Dissertation discussing literary origins of this story

American folk songs
Year of song unknown
Songwriter unknown